David Cohen (31 December 1882, Deventer – 3 September 1967, Amsterdam) was a Dutch classicist and papyrologist and one of the two chairs of the  (or , of Amsterdam) during the occupation of the Netherlands in World War II. He was Professor of Ancient History at the University of Amsterdam and a prominent Zionist leader.

Education and career until 1940 
Cohen was educated at Leiden University. He was a teacher in The Hague and became a private lecturer at the University of Leiden. In 1924 he became a professor by special appointment at the same university. Two years later he was appointed full professor of Ancient History at the Municipal University of Amsterdam. Cohen was one of the founders and editor of Hermeneus: Monthly Magazine for Ancient Culture, the first edition of which appeared in 1928.

Second World War and after 
In 1941 Cohen and Asscher were appointed by the German occupiers as chairs of the Jewish Council for Amsterdam.  In September 1943, Cohen and Abraham Asscher were themselves arrested and taken to the Westerbork transit camp. Later they were deported from there, Cohen to the Theresienstadt concentration camp. There he survived the war.

After the war, the presidency of the Jewish Council was severely criticized. In 1947, the Jewish Honor Council forbade him to fulfill a position within the Jewish community; this decision was canceled in 1950. Cohen did, however, regain his professorship after the war at the University of Amsterdam, where he retired in 1953.

Family 
Cohen was the father of the architect Herman Cohen (1914–2005), who helped build the state of Israel from 1939 to 1967. One of his grandchildren is the doctor and former PvdA politician Rob Oudkerk. He was a brother of the well-known writer .

Literature 

 David Cohen, Roaming and Wandering. The Jewish Refugees in the Netherlands in the Years 1933–1940. With an Introduction About the Years 1900–1933. Haarlem: De Erven F. Bohn NV, 1955.
 , Rome, Athens, Jerusalem. Life and Work of Prof. Dr. David Cohen. Groningen: Historical Publisher, 2000, 
 Herman Cohen, Jew in Palestine. Memories 1939–1948. Amsterdam: Meulenhoff, 1995, 
 Erik Somers, President of the Jewish Council. The Memories of David Cohen (1941–1943). Introduced and annotated by Erik Somers. Zutphen: Walburg Press, 2010,

References 

1882 births
1967 deaths
Theresienstadt Ghetto survivors
Academic staff of Leiden University
20th-century Dutch historians
People from Deventer
Academic staff of the University of Amsterdam
Jewish Council of Amsterdam
Papyrologists